Mel O'Callaghan (born 1975) is an Australian-born contemporary artist who works in video, performance, sculpture, installation, and painting. Her work has been exhibited in solo and group exhibitions around the world and received a number of awards for her artistic practice, and her work is held in a various collections in Australia and France.

Early life and education 
O'Callaghan was born in Sydney, Australia in 1975. She attained a Bachelor of Visual Arts with Honours from the Sydney College of Arts, University of Sydney, and a Masters of Fine Arts in Research from the College of Fine Arts (COFA), University of New South Wales, and a Bachelor of Science Architecture from the University of Sydney.

Practice

She is interested in human behaviour, psychology, and transformative states.
 Her work is experiential and looks at the human condition and ritual.

O'Callaghan lives and works in Paris, France and Sydney, Australia. She and her husband, Clemens Habicht, founded the Parisian art gallery Galerie Allen in 2013.

Exhibitions 

O'Callaghan has been in solo and group exhibitions around the world and received a number of awards for her artistic practice.

Centre of the Centre 
Centre of the Centre was O'Callaghan's first large scale exhibition in an Australian public institution. Combining a large-scale video, sculptural installations, and regular performances, the show explored the origins of life and regeneration 

The video was a result of multiple cross-disciplinary collaborations, including one with Daniel Fornari from the Woods Hole Oceanographic Institution in Massachusetts. It is 20 minutes long, was projected 7 metres wide, and includes underwater shots of thermal vents in the Pacific Ocean as well as the coco worm. The performances involved breath-induced trances and took place around the exhibition's glass and metal sculptures.

Centre of the Centre was commissioned by Le Confort Moderne, Poitiers; Artspace, Sydney; and UQ Art Museum, Brisbane. It premiered at the former in June 2019 and will be on show at the latter until January 2021, after which it will tour  various other Australian venues.

Major solo exhibitions 
O'Callaghan has had solo exhibitions in many parts of the world, including Australia, France, The Netherlands, Portugal, Spain, and the USA.

 2019: Centre of the Centre, Artspace, Sydney, Australia
 2018: Primary/Secondary Score, Barangaroo et Carriageworks, Sydney, Australia
 2017: Mel O'Callaghan: Ensemble, National Gallery of Victoria (NGV) Melbourne, Australia, Kronenberg Wright, Sydney, Australia
 2017: Dangerous on-the-way, Palais de Tokyo, Paris, France
 2004: The Fall, Salles E.M. Sandoz M. David Weill, Cité internationale des arts, Paris, France
 2003: In the Half Light, 4A Centre for Contemporary Asian Art, Sydney, Australia
 2002: The Fly and the Mountain, Art Gallery of New South Wales (AGNSW), Sydney, Australia

Major group exhibitions 
O'Callaghan has been involved in group exhibitions in Australia, Brazil, France, Germany, Italy, the Netherlands, Norway, the Philippines, Portugal, Singapore, Spain, Taiwan, and the UK.

 2019: Yo-Chang Art Museum, National Taiwan University of Arts
 2018: 200 Videos, Museo D'Art Contemporanea di Roma, Italy
 2018: International Film Festival Rotterdam, The Netherlands
 2016: L'art de la re'volte (The Art of Revolt), Hors-Pistes, Centre Pompidou, Malaga, Spain
 2015: Nature/Revelation, The Ian Potter Museum, National Gallery of Victoria (NGV), Melbourne, Australia
 2014: 19th Biennale of Sydney, You Imagine What You Desire, Sydney, Australia
 2010: Dying in Spite of the Miraculous, Gurtrude Contemporary art Space and Melbourne International Arts Festival, Melbourne, Australia
 2010: La Main Numerique, National Taiwan Museum of Fine Arts, Taipei, Taiwan
 2006: Videoformes, Prix de la Creation Video, Clermont Ferrand, France
 2005: National Sculpture Prize, National Gallery of Australia (NGA), Canberra, Australia
 2005 Videobrasil 05 15º, Internacional Video Art Biennale, São Paulo, Brazil
 2003: Printroom, Gertrude Centre for Contemporary Art, Melbourne, Australia
 2001: Helen Lempriere Travelling Art Award, Artspace, Sydney, Australia

Major grants, awards, residencies 

 2019: Aide de Projet, Fondation National des Arts Graphiques et Plastiques (FNAGP)
 2017: Finalist, Prix Meurice pour l'art contemporain, France
 2017: Fondation National des Arts Graphiques et Plastiques (FNAGP), Artist Studio, Nogent-sur-Marne, France
 2017: Cité internationale des arts, Artist Residency, Paris, France
 2016: Cité internationale des arts, Artist Residency, Paris, France
 2015: Recipient, Prix SAM pour l'Art Contemporain, France
 2014: Nominated for the Bernd Lohaus Prize, Belgium
 2014: Finalist, Kaldor Public Arts Projects, Sydney, Australia
 2011: Cité Internationale des Arts, Artist Residency, Paris, France
 2007: Cité Internationale des Arts, Artist Residency, Paris, France
 2005: Cité Internationale des Arts, Artist Residency, Paris, France
 2005: National Sculpture Prize, Finalist, National Gallery of Australia (NGA), Australia
 2005: Australian Film Commission, Australia
 2004: Cité International des Arts, Artist Residency, Paris, France
 2001: Centre for Contemporary Art, Artist Residency, Prague, Czech Republic
 2001: Finalist, Helen Lempriere Travelling Art Award

Collections 
O'Callaghan's work is held in a various collections in Australia and France.
 Ensemble (2013) at the National Gallery of Victoria, Melbourne, Australia
Framework (2014) at FRAC Bretagne, Rennes, France
 Monash University Museum of Modern Art (MUMA), Australia
 Artbank, Australian Government Art Collection, Australia
 Attorney General's Department, Australian Government
 Musee National d'Art Moderne/Centre Pompidou, Paris, France

References 



1975 births
Living people
Australian contemporary artists
21st-century Australian artists